James Melia (born 1 November 1937) is an English former footballer who spent most of his career playing for Liverpool and went on to become a manager.

Playing career

Liverpool

Melia joined the Reds straight from St. Anthony's School as a 15-year-old, when manager Don Welsh saw the potential in the young schoolboy international's feet. Melia signed professional forms on his 17th birthday, 1 November 1954. After 23 appearances for Liverpool's reserve team, Melia made his début aged 18 on 17 December 1955 at Anfield in a 2nd Division fixture against Nottingham Forest. The visitors came up against an in form Billy Liddell who scored a hat-trick in the 5–2 victory, Jimmy also scored his first goal for the club in the 48th minute, John Evans got the other.

It wasn't until the following season that he got a real run in the side starting 27 matches. Melia followed this up with a 36 match season scoring 10 goals.

Melia did well in the first Division and played thirty nine times as Liverpool finished in eighth place. Unfortunately for the red half of Merseyside Everton won the league and were seventeen points better.

During this spell Melia caught the eye of England manager Alf Ramsey who gave him his debut on 6 April 1963 in the 2–1 British Championship loss at Wembley to Scotland. Melia's one and only goal came in his second and final appearance for his country, on 5 June 1963 at St. Jakob Park, Basel as England beat Switzerland 8–1.

The next season Liverpool won the championship by four points from Manchester United. Melia, now aged 27, could add a championship medal to the second division title medal he already owned. By this time, however, he had joined Wolves, moving in March 1964 for a club record transfer fee of £48,000, but had played enough games for Liverpool to get the medal.

Wolverhampton Wanderers
His stay in the Midlands was a short one. While he had a good run in the first team, this came to an abrupt end when manager Stan Cullis was sacked and replaced by Andy Beattie. Beattie decided that Melia was not the type of player he wanted and quickly offloaded him to Southampton.

Southampton
In December 1964, Melia was signed for a fee of £30,000 by Southampton's manager Ted Bates "who was keen to acquire his scheming visionary skills". Melia was reluctant to move to the south coast, but when he was eventually persuaded, "Saints' (then) record signing added finesse" to the midfield. Although Saints missed out on promotion at the end of the 1964–65 season, Melia linked up well with Terry Paine and Martin Chivers in the following season, helping them to promotion from Division 2, finishing five points behind champions Manchester City.

He remained an ever-present for Southampton in their first season in Division 1, as they narrowly hung on to their place in the top flight, with Melia's crosses helping Ron Davies and Chivers score 37 and 14 goals respectively, adding four for himself, the best being a header in a 2–1 victory over Arsenal on 27 December 1966.

He continued to make a valuable contribution to the team but lost his place to Mick Channon and in November 1968 he moved on to Aldershot for a £10,000 fee and the player manager's job.

In his four years at The Dell he made a total of 152 appearances, scoring twelve goals.

Management career

Aldershot and Crewe Alexandra
Melia joined Aldershot as player-coach in November 1968, taking the management position in April 1969. Melia moved on from Aldershot in February 1972 to take up a similar role at Crewe Alexandra; after retiring as a player in May 1972, he took on the managerial role at Gresty Road full-time. While at Aldershot, Melia gained a reputation for his hard-hitting and occasionally controversial column in the club's match day programme.

Brighton & Hove Albion
He went on to manage Brighton & Hove Albion during the 1982–83 season - being promoted from his former role as Albion's chief scout - where his greatest managerial feat occurred when he took them to the 1983 FA Cup Final. The run took Melia back to his old stomping ground of Anfield where a goal from another ex-Liverpool player Jimmy Case won the game. During the cup run Melia became famous for his 'disco' style of dress and his glamorous younger girlfriend, Val Lloyd. Brighton drew the final, and then lost the replay, to Manchester United and were also relegated from the first division. Melia, who had only been appointed as an interim manager, resigned his post on 19 October 1983, reportedly due to his disdain at backroom meddling by first-team coach Chris Cattlin.

After Brighton
Melia went on to spells in charge of Southport, Portuguese side Belenenses and Stockport County.

In 1989 Jimmy had a stint in youth training when he travelled to Sharjah in the United Arab Emirates where he set up an academy. He currently coaches youth teams for Liverpool FC America in The Colony, Texas, after joining them in 2008. He had gone to America to coach in the 1970s, as an assistant to Laurie Callaway with the Southern California Lazers in 1978 and head coach of the Cleveland Cobras in 1979.

Honours

As a player
Liverpool
 Football League Division 1 championship: 1963–64
 Football League Division 2 championship: 1961–62

Southampton
 Football League Division 2 runner-up: 1965–66

As a manager
Brighton & Hove Albion
 FA Cup finalists 1983

References

External links
Player profile at LFChistory.net

Management statistics on Soccerbase

1937 births
Living people
English footballers
England international footballers
English Football League players
Aldershot F.C. players
Liverpool F.C. players
Southampton F.C. players
Wolverhampton Wanderers F.C. players
English football managers
Aldershot F.C. managers
Brighton & Hove Albion F.C. managers
Crewe Alexandra F.C. managers
Stockport County F.C. managers
C.F. Os Belenenses managers
American Soccer League (1933–1983) coaches
Footballers from Liverpool
English Football League managers
Southport F.C. managers
English Football League representative players
Crewe Alexandra F.C. players
Association football midfielders
Player-coaches
English expatriate football managers
Expatriate soccer managers in the United States
English expatriate sportspeople in the United States